Diiodoethane may refer to:

 1,1-Diiodoethane
 1,2-Diiodoethane